Klamath Glen is an unincorporated community in Del Norte County, California. It is located on the Klamath River  from its mouth, at an elevation of 46 feet (14 m).

References

External links

Unincorporated communities in Del Norte County, California
Klamath River
Unincorporated communities in California
Glens of the United States
Valleys of California